The Mandau is a  river in Bohemia (Czech Republic) and Saxony (Germany). It is a left tributary of the Lusatian Neisse, which it joins near Zittau.

It originates from multiple springs north of the 580.6m (1902 feet AMSL) Wolf Mountain (Czech: Vlčí hora, German: Wolfsberg) in the Šluknov Hook, which join in Panský (German: Herrnwalde) at 1690 feet above sea level. Coming from Zahrady (German: Gärten) another stream joins in Nové Křečany (Neu Ehrenberg). From there the Mandau flows in a southeasterly direction through Rumburk (Rumburg; Bohemia), Seifhennersdorf (Saxony, Upper Lusatia) and Varnsdorf (Warnsdorf; Bohemia).

See also
List of rivers of the Czech Republic
List of rivers of Saxony

International rivers of Europe
Rivers of the Ústí nad Labem Region
Rivers of Saxony
Populated places in Děčín District
Görlitz (district)
Rivers of Germany